Early general elections were held in Peru on 8 April 2001, with a second round of the presidential election on 3 June. The elections were held after President Alberto Fujimori claimed asylum in Japan during a trip to Asia and resigned his position.

The presidential elections were won by Alejandro Toledo of Possible Peru, who had been defeated by Fujimori in the 2000 general election, while his party emerged as the largest faction in the Congress.

Candidates

Main presidential candidates

Other candidates 
 Carlos Boloña, economist and former Minister of Economy and Finance (1991-1993) – People's Solution
 Ciro Gálvez, lawyer and notary head – Andean Renaissance
 Marco Antonio Arrunátegui, economist – Project Country
 Ricardo Noriega, lawyer and economist – All for Victory

Voluntarily withdrawn 
 Luis Castañeda, lawyer and former presidential nominee – National Solidarity
 Jorge Santistevan, lawyer and first national ombudsman – Independent Movement We Are Peru - Democratic Cause
 Hernando de Soto, economist – Popular Capital
 Víctor M. Marroquín, international lawyer – Youth Independent Movement
 Martina Portocarrero, folklore singer – Agricultural People's Front of Peru

Results

President

Congress

References

Elections in Peru
Peru
2001 in Peru
Presidential elections in Peru
Peru
Peru